Bresaola is air-dried, salted beef (but it can also be made of horse, venison and pork) that has been aged two or three months until it becomes hard and turns a dark red, almost purple color. It is made from top (inside) round, and it is lean and tender, with a sweet, musty smell. It originated in Valtellina, a valley in the Alps of northern Italy's Lombardy region.

The word comes from the diminutive of Lombard  ("braised").

Production
A strict trimming process is essential to give the unique flavour. Legs of beef are thoroughly defatted and seasoned with a dry rub of coarse salt and spices, such as juniper berries, cinnamon and nutmeg. They are then left to cure for a few days. A drying period of between one and three months follows, depending on the weight of the particular bresaola. The meat loses up to 40% of its original weight during aging.

In Valtellina, a similar process is applied to smaller pieces of meat. This produces a more strongly flavoured product, slinzega. Traditionally, horse meat was used for slinzega, but now other meats, such as venison and pork, are used as well.

Serving
As an antipasto, bresaola is usually sliced paper-thin and served at room temperature or slightly chilled. It is most commonly served and eaten with drizzled olive oil and lemon juice or balsamic vinegar, and served with rocket (rucola, arugula) salad, cracked black pepper, and fresh Parmesan cheese. Bresaola is sometimes confused with carpaccio, which is made from thinly sliced raw beef (the other ingredients are the same). Sliced bresaola should be stored well wrapped in a refrigerator.

Similar products

The bresaola produced in Valtellina is now a protected geographical indication (PGI) under EU Regulation 2081/92. Since this designation, dried beef made outside Valtellina may carry a generic name such as viande séchée". There are traditional products from several other areas that are similar:

 Biltong: air dried cured meat from South Africa with a taste very similar to Bresaola
 Bündnerfleisch (Bindenfleisch): another Alpine dried meat from across the border in Grisons, Switzerland
 Brési: from the Doubs region of France
 Carne de sol: from northeastern Brazil
 Carpaccio di bue: from Italy is a fresh (non-preserved) variant popularized as an appetizer in 1950
 Pastirma: a highly seasoned, air-dried cured beef that is found in the cuisines of the eastern Mediterranean.

See also

 List of dried foods
 List of smoked foods
 Salumi

References

External links

 Consorzio tutela Bresaola della Valtellina, Protected Geographical Status Consortium

Salumi
Italian cuisine
Beef
Dried meat
Italian products with protected designation of origin
Smoked meat